The Nahlin River is a river in far northwestern British Columbia, Canada, flowing northwest to meet the Sheslay River, forming there the commencement of the Inklin River, the main southeast fork of the Taku.

The main tributaries of the Nahlin River include the Dudidontu River and the Koshin River.

See also
Nahlin Mountain
Nahlin Plateau

References

Cassiar Country
Rivers of British Columbia